The Paul Birdsall Prize is an biennial prize given to a historian by the American Historical Association.

Background 

The prize was established by a donation from Hans W. Gatzke, who remained anonymous until his death.  The prize is named for Paul M. Birdsall, a historian of European diplomatic and military affairs, and a foreign service officer.

Eligibility 

Preference will be given to early-career academics, but established scholars and nonacademic candidates will not be excluded.
Books published in English and bearing a copyright of 2016 or 2017 are eligible for the 2018 prize..

Notable winners 

Past winners of the prize include:

1986: Robert A. Doughty for The Seeds of Disaster: The Development of French Army Doctrine, 1919-1939

1990: Brian Villa for Unauthorized Action: Mountbatten and the Dieppe Raid

1992: Dennis Showalter for Tannenberg: Clash of Empires 1914

1994: Leonard V. Smith for Between Mutiny and Obedience: The Case of the French Fifth Infantry Division During World War I

1996: David G. Herrmann for The Arming of Europe and the Making of the First World War

1998: John F. Beeler for British Naval Policy in the Gladstone-Disraeli Era, 1866-1880

2000: Marc Trachtenberg for A Constructed Peace: The Making of the European Settlement, 1945-1963

2002: Matthew Connelly for A Diplomatic Revolution: Algeria's Fight for Independence and the Origins of the Post-Cold War Era

2004: Robert M. Citino for Blitzkrieg to Desert Storm: The Evolution of Operational Warfare

2006: Mark Atwood Lawrence for Assuming the Burden: Europe and the American Commitment to War in Vietnam

2008: Jeffrey A. Engel for Cold War at 30,000 Feet: The Anglo-American Aviation Fight for Supremacy

2010: Jonathan Reed Winkler for Nexus: Strategic Communications and American Security in World War I

2012: Edith Sheffer for Burned Bridge: how East and West Germans Made the Iron Curtain

2014: Jacob Darwin Hamblin for Arming Mother Nature: The Birth of Catastrophic Environmentalism

2016: Bruno Cabanes for The Great War and the Origins of Humanitarianism, 1918-1924

2018: Tarak Barkawi for Soldiers of Empire: Indian and British Armies in World War II

2020: Brandon M. Schechter for The Stuff of Soldiers: A History of the Red Army in World War II through Objects

2022: Bastiaan Willems for Violence in Defeat: The Wehrmacht on German Soil, 1944-1945

References

External links

 

American Historical Association book prizes